The Palmerston Forts around the north east of England include:

Abbs Point Battery, Roker, Sunderland
Cemetery Battery, Hartlepool
Frenchman's Battery, South Shields
Heugh Battery (Hartlepool Battery), Hartlepool
Lighthouse Battery, Hartlepool
Fort Paull, Kingston upon Hull
South Gare Battery, Redcar and Cleveland
Spanish Battery, Tynemouth
Tynemouth Castle, Tynemouth
Wave Basin Battery, Sunderland

North east